Horseshoe Run is a stream in the U.S. state of West Virginia. It is a tributary of the Cheat River.

Horseshoe Run was so named on account of the fact that it enters the Cheat at Horseshoe Bend, a horseshoe-shaped meander in the river.

See also
List of rivers of West Virginia

References

Rivers of Preston County, West Virginia
Rivers of Tucker County, West Virginia
Rivers of West Virginia